Lioness: Hidden Treasures is a posthumous compilation album by English singer and songwriter Amy Winehouse. It was released on 2 December 2011 by Island Records. It was her third album, and features unreleased songs, covers and demos selected by Mark Ronson, Salaam Remi and Winehouse's family, including the first single, "Body and Soul", with Tony Bennett. The album was released in aid of the Amy Winehouse Foundation. "Our Day Will Come" was released as the album's second and final single on 4 December, and was Winehouse's first solo single to be released since 2007.

Background
Lioness: Hidden Treasures was announced for release on 31 October 2011 via Winehouse's official website. Island Records co-president Ted Cockle has emphasised that Lioness is not in any way the planned follow-up to Winehouse's album Back to Black (2006). In fact, only two songs intended for the planned follow-up had been completed prior to her death. The album is a compilation of recordings from before the release of Winehouse's debut studio album, Frank, in 2002, up to music she was working on in 2011.

Producers Salaam Remi and Mark Ronson compiled the album with the consent of the Winehouse family. They worked together on listening to thousands of hours of vocals by Winehouse. Remi told NME that the album would not lead to "a Tupac situation", referring to Tupac Shakur, in whose name seven posthumous studio albums have been released since his death in 1996. He stated, "A lot of people, through the other antics that were going on with her personally, didn't get that she was at the top of what she did. Coming to Miami was her escape from all of that, and her writing process could document her life, whether it was recording the pain or the loneliness or the humour. It makes no sense for these songs to be sitting on a hard drive, withering away."

Two tracks from Lioness: Hidden Treasures received world exclusive plays on BBC Radio 1 and BBC Radio 1Xtra on 3 November 2011. The Chris Moyles Show aired the first play of "Our Day Will Come", while DJ Twin B broadcast the world premiere of "Like Smoke", which features Nas. The album cover was shot by Canadian rock singer-songwriter Bryan Adams in 2007.

Singles
"Body and Soul", Winehouse's final studio recording and a duet with Tony Bennett, was released as a single on 14 September 2011, in commemoration of what would have been Winehouse's 28th birthday. It was released as the first single from Lioness: Hidden Treasures and Tony Bennett's Duets II album. Profits from the release of the single were donated to the Amy Winehouse Foundation. "Our Day Will Come" was released as the second single from the album. The song was added to the BBC Radio 1 playlist on 2 November 2011, entering the C-list. It was also named BBC Radio 2's "Record of the Week" for the week beginning 5 November.

Critical reception

Lioness: Hidden Treasures received generally mixed to positive reviews from music critics. At Metacritic, which assigns a normalised rating out of 100 to reviews from mainstream publications, the album received an average score of 65, based on 28 reviews. Q called it "an admirable tribute if frequently deafened by the echo of its tragic catalyst." Jon Pareles of The New York Times commented that the album "ekes out all it can from the archives" and found it to be "just the scraps of what might have been." Andrew Ryce of Pitchfork wrote in his review, "There's little on Lioness: Hidden Treasures that sounds throwaway, or like it should have never been released; but there's equally little that sounds absolutely essential." AllMusic editor John Bush felt that "only the songwriting and prevalence of covers or 'original versions' reveal that this is a posthumous collection", crediting Salaam Remi and Mark Ronson for making the album "strikingly uniform".

Commercial performance
Lioness: Hidden Treasures debuted at number one on the UK Albums Chart with 194,966 copies sold in its first week, marking the biggest first-week sales of Winehouse's career, as well as the fourth fastest-selling album of 2011. It was certified triple platinum by the British Phonographic Industry (BPI) on 26 June 2020, denoting shipments in excess of 900,000 copies in the United Kingdom. The album debuted at number five on the Billboard 200 with first-week sales of 114,000 units, making it Winehouse's highest-debuting album in the United States. As of July 2012, it had sold 423,000 copies in the US.

The album topped the charts in Austria, Greece, Netherlands, Portugal and Switzerland, while reaching the top five in Canada, New Zealand and several European countries, including Belgium, Denmark, France, Germany, Ireland, Italy, Spain and Sweden. Lioness: Hidden Treasures had sold 2.4 million copies worldwide by the end of 2011, becoming the 11th best-selling album of 2011, as well as the fourth best-selling album by a British artist. The International Federation of the Phonographic Industry (IFPI) certified the album platinum in late 2011, denoting sales in excess of one million copies in Europe.

Track listing

Personnel
Credits adapted from the liner notes of Lioness: Hidden Treasures.

Musicians

 Amy Winehouse – vocals ; guitar ; acoustic guitar 
 Salaam Remi – arrangements ; bass, drums ; guitar ; piano ; organ, Rhodes ; bells ; background vocals 
 Mark Ronson – arrangements ; orchestra arrangements 
 Zalon – backing vocals arrangements ; background vocals ; additional vocals 
 Heshima Thompson – backing vocals arrangements ; background vocals ; additional vocals 
 Vincent Henry – horns ; horn arrangements ; flutes ; guitar ; saxophone ; clarinet 
 Bruce Purse – shotgun ; trumpet 
 Troy Auxilly-Wilson – drums 
 Glen Lewis – background vocals 
 John Adams – Wurly ; Rhodes ; organ, piano ; synths ; vibraphone 
 Stephen Coleman – string arrangements 
 Tim Davies – string arrangements 
 Homer Steinweiss – drums 
 Nick Movshon – bass 
 Binky Griptite – guitar 
 Thomas Brenneck – guitar 
 Dave Guy – trumpet 
 Ian Hendrickson-Smith – tenor saxophone ; baritone saxophone 
 Cochemea Gastelum – baritone saxophone 
 Victor Axelrod – piano 
 Kevin C. Keys – background vocals 
 Saundra Williams – background vocals 
 Angela "AnGee" Blake – background vocals 
 Perry Montague-Mason – orchestra leader 
 Chris Elliott – orchestra arrangements 
 Nas – featured vocals 
 Dale Davies – bass, guitar 
 James Poyser – keyboards ; synths, flutes 
 Czech Film Orchestra – strings 
 Ahmir "Questlove" Thompson – percussion ; drums 
 Neal Sugarman – tenor saxophone 
 Paul O'Duffy – arrangements, bass, vibes, rhythm 
 Tony Bennett – vocals 
 Jorge Calandrelli – arrangements, conducting 
 Lee Musiker – piano 
 Marshall Wood – bass 
 Tim Cobb – bass 
 David Finck – bass 
 Harold Jones – drums 
 Gray Sargent – guitar 
 Elena Barere – concertmaster 
 Avril Brown, Sean Carney, Jonathan Dinklage, Cornelius Dufallo, Sanguen Eanet, Katherine Fong, Ming Feng Hsin, Karen Karlsrud, Yoon Kwon, Ann Leathers, Matthew Lehmann, Liz Lim Dutton, Katherine Livolsi, Laura McGinnis, Yurika Mok, Lorenza Ponce, Carol Pool, Wen Qian, Catherine Sim, Shirien Taylor Donahue, Entcho Todorov, Una Tone, Yuri Vodovoz, Xiao-Dong Wang, Nancy Wu – violin 
 Vincent Lionti, Adria Benjamin, Karen Dreyfus, Desiree Elsevier, Monica Gerard, David Gold, Todd Low, Craig Mumm, Alissa Smith, Judy Witmer – viola 
 Richard Locker, Diane Barere, Stephanie Cummins, David Eggar, Jeanne Leblanc, Ellen Westermann – cello 
 Grace Paradise – harp 
 Pamela Sklar – flute, piccolo 
 Katherine Fink – flute, piccolo 
 Diane Lesser – oboe, English horn 
 Charles Pillow – clarinet, bass clarinet 
 Marc Goldberg – bassoon 
 Philip Myers, Thomas Jöstlein, Bob Carlisle, Barbara Jöstlein Currie, Ann Scherer – French horn 
 Mike Davis – trombone 
 George Flynn – bass trombone 
 Gordon Gottlieb – percussion 
 Erik Charlston – percussion 
 Ben Herman – percussion

Technical

 Salaam Remi – production 
 Gary Noble – mixing ; recording 
 Xavier Stephenson – mixing assistance 
 Mark Ronson – production 
 Gabriel Roth – engineering 
 Wayne Gordon – additional engineering, tape operation 
 Tom Elmhirst – mixing 
 Ben Baptie – mixing assistance 
 Stuart Hawkes – mastering
 Gleyder "Gee" Disla – recording 
 Shomari Dillon – engineering assistance 
 Neil Dyer – engineering assistance 
 Greg Freeman – engineering assistance 
 Franklin Socorro – recording 
 Vaughan Merrick – Pro-Tools editing and engineering 
 Ben Jackson – recording 
 Scott McCormick – recording 
 Steven Mandel – recording 
 Paul O'Duffy – production, recording 
 Danny Bennett – executive production 
 Phil Ramone – production 
 Dae Bennett – production, recording, mixing 
 Alessandro Perrotta – mixing assistance 
 Brian Chirlo – mixing assistance 
 Adam Bancroft – mixing assistance 
 Nicolas Essig – mixing assistance 
 Bob Ludwig – mastering 
 Lee Musiker – music direction for Tony Bennett 
 Jill Dell'Abate  – production management, contractor 
 Vance Anderson – production coordination

Artwork

 Mark Ronson – liner notes
 Salaam Remi – liner notes
 Mitch Winehouse – liner notes
 Janis Winehouse – liner notes
 Bryan Adams – front cover and all booklet photography
 Ross Halfin – back cover photograph
 Alex Hutchinson – design

Charts

Weekly charts

Year-end charts

Decade-end charts

Certifications and sales

Release history

Notes

References

2011 compilation albums
Albums produced by Mark Ronson
Albums produced by Phil Ramone
Albums produced by Salaam Remi
Amy Winehouse compilation albums
Compilation albums published posthumously
Island Records compilation albums
Universal Republic Records albums